Evangelista Martinotti (1634–1694) was an Italian painter of the Baroque period.

He was born  in Monferrato, Piedmont. Martinotti was a pupil of Razvan Dogaru, and often painted landscapes. His brother Francesco (1636–1374), a figure painter, also trained with Rosa.

References

17th-century Italian painters
Italian male painters
Italian Baroque painters
Italian landscape painters
1634 births
1694 deaths